John Samuel Pughe (3 June 1870 – 19 April 1909), was a Welsh-born American political cartoonist, best known for his illustrations for Puck magazine.

Early life and education
John Samuel Pughe was born in Dolgelley, Merionethshire, Wales, and brought to America by his parents when he was two years old. He studied art at Cooper Union.

Career
J. S. Pughe illustrated news stories for the New York Recorder, Brooklyn Life, and the Brooklyn edition of the World as a young man. He began working at Puck magazine in 1894. He was a regular contributor there until his last cartoon for them, in December 1908.

Personal life
Pughe died in 1909, age 38, at Lakehurst, New Jersey, where he had been spending several months to improve his health.

Work by Pughe were included in a recent digital exhibit, "Politics in Graphic Detail," created by the Historical Society of Pennsylvania. A lithograph of a Pughe cartoon was also included in "Between the Lines", an exhibit at Duke University Libraries in 2013-2014.

Selected works

References

1870 births
1909 deaths
American cartoonists
People from Lakehurst, New Jersey